Takashi Ishizaki   is a Japanese mixed martial artist.

Mixed martial arts record

|-
| Loss
| align=center| 1-4-1
| Yuji Ito
| Submission (kimura)
| Shooto - Shooto
| 
| align=center| 1
| align=center| 2:11
| Tokyo, Japan
| 
|-
| Loss
| align=center| 1-3-1
| Noboru Asahi
| Submission (armbar)
| Shooto - Shooto
| 
| align=center| 5
| align=center| 0:43
| Tokyo, Japan
| 
|-
| Win
| align=center| 1-2-1
| Masato Suzuki
| Decision (unanimous)
| Shooto - Shooto
| 
| align=center| 4
| align=center| 3:00
| Tokyo, Japan
| 
|-
| Loss
| align=center| 0-2-1
| Noboru Asahi
| Decision (unanimous)
| Shooto - Shooto
| 
| align=center| 4
| align=center| 3:00
| Tokyo, Japan
| 
|-
| Draw
| align=center| 0-1-1
| Manabu Yamada
| Draw
| Shooto - Shooto
| 
| align=center| 3
| align=center| 3:00
| Tokyo, Japan
| 
|-
| Loss
| align=center| 0-1
| Naoki Sakurada
| Decision (unanimous)
| Shooto - Shooto
| 
| align=center| 3
| align=center| 3:00
| Tokyo, Japan
|

See also
List of male mixed martial artists

References

External links
 
 Takashi Ishizaki at mixedmartialarts.com

Japanese male mixed martial artists
Living people
Year of birth missing (living people)